Cai Shu (born June 14, 1962) is a retired male high jumper from PR China, who competed for his native Asian country at the 1984 Summer Olympics.

Achievements

References
sports-reference

1962 births
Living people
Athletes (track and field) at the 1984 Summer Olympics
Chinese male high jumpers
Olympic athletes of China
Athletes (track and field) at the 1982 Asian Games
Asian Games medalists in athletics (track and field)
Asian Games silver medalists for China
Medalists at the 1982 Asian Games
20th-century Chinese people